Holbert Run is a  long 2nd order tributary to the Ohio River in Hancock County, West Virginia.  This is the only stream of this name in the United States.

Course
Holbert Run rises about 2 miles north of Sun Valley, West Virginia, in Hancock County and then flows generally west-southwest to join the Ohio River about 2.5 miles north of Weirton.

Watershed
Holbert Run drains  of area, receives about 38.3 in/year of precipitation, has a wetness index of 279.73, and is about 87% forested.

See also
List of rivers of West Virginia

References

Rivers of West Virginia
Rivers of Hancock County, West Virginia
Tributaries of the Ohio River